'' is a stand used in the Shinto rituals of shinto to place shinsen. In ancient times, it was also used to present objects to a noble person. The same type of stand is also used in temples, but in this case it is sometimes written sampo, which stands for Three Treasures (Sangha, Dharma, Buddha).

Structure 
Usually made of Cypress or other wood, it has a rectangular base (body) attached to a tray called an oshiki. It is called "sanpō" (three-way) because there are holes called kurikata in three directions on the base.

Originally, the ori-shiki and the stand were separated and the ori-shiki was placed on the stand when used, and sometimes the ori-shiki was used alone without the stand. Today, the folded mat and stand are completely combined, and those used only with the folded mat are prepared separately from the three sides of the mat.

There are no rules for the design of the holes in the stand, but the giboshi shape is often used.

The folded cloth has a binding to hold the edge board in place, which is made so that the side without holes is the opposite side. When offering to the gods, the side without the hole (the side opposite the binding) should face the gods. When holding the three sides of the bowl with the food offerings on it, the thumbs should be placed on the right and left edges, and the other fingers should be placed on the orihiki and the stand, holding the bowl at eye level. However, in the court etiquette, the fingers are traditionally placed inside the oriziki.

References 

Japanese culture
Buddhist ritual implements
Shinto religious objects
Pages with unreviewed translations